Dolabrifera brazieri is a species of sea slug or sea hare, a marine opisthobranch gastropod mollusc in the family Aplysiidae, the sea hares.

References

 Burn R. (2006) A checklist and bibliography of the Opisthobranchia (Mollusca: Gastropoda) of Victoria and the Bass Strait area, south-eastern Australia. Museum Victoria Science Reports 10:1–42.

Books 
 Powell A. W. B., New Zealand Mollusca, William Collins Publishers Ltd, Auckland, New Zealand 1979 

Aplysiidae
Gastropods of Australia
Gastropods of New Zealand
Gastropods described in 1870